The Apocalypse Element is a Big Finish Productions audio drama based on the long-running British science fiction television series Doctor Who. It forms the second serial in the Dalek Empire arc, following on from events in The Genocide Machine.  The arc continues in The Mutant Phase and concludes in The Time of the Daleks.

Plot
At a conference on Archetryx between major temporal powers, the Sixth Doctor and Evelyn discover that Romana has been missing for twenty years and that the Daleks' newest weapon — the Apocalypse Element — threatens not only the Time Lords but the entire galaxy.

Cast
The Doctor — Colin Baker
Evelyn Smythe — Maggie Stables
Romana — Lalla Ward
Monitor Trinkett — Karen Henson
Assistant Monitor Ensac — James Campbell
Commander Vorna — Andrea Newland
Coordinator Vansell — Anthony Keetch
Monan Host — Toby Longworth
The President — Michael Wade
Dalek Voices — Alistair Lock and Nicholas Briggs
Vrint — Andrew Fettes
Captain Reldath — Andrew Fettes

Notes
This is the first official appearance of Romana in a production since she left the Fourth Doctor and stayed in E-Space in Warriors' Gate.  Later novels established that she returned to normal space, as well as returning to Gallifrey, where she eventually became President of the High Council.  She returns in future plays such as Neverland, Zagreus and the Gallifrey series.  The audio story The Chaos Pool shows her before she became President, but just after she returned from E-Space.
This story forms the second serial in the Dalek Empire arc, a storyline that started with the Seventh Doctor (The Genocide Machine), continues with the Fifth (The Mutant Phase) and concludes with the Eighth (The Time of the Daleks).  Elements from these stories tie in with the Dalek Empire series.
This story attempts to explain why, in the 1996 Doctor Who television movie, the Eye of Harmony is opened with a human retinal pattern.
The Seriphia galaxy is cleansed of life in this story, as part of the Daleks' grand plan to usurp the galaxy without resistance. Although President Romana vowed to block the Daleks from taking Seriphia, by the time of the Dalek Empire spin-off series, Seriphia has become the Daleks' main powerbase. This would suggest that the turbulent political events in the Gallifrey audio series left Seriphia open to the Daleks.
An article by Russell T Davies in the Doctor Who Annual 2006 refers to the events of this story ("the Etra Prime Incident") as one of the opening skirmishes of the Time War.
Romana reassumes the Presidency of the High Council of Time Lords at the end of this story.
This story also introduces the Monan Host, one of several "temporal powers" in the Doctor Who universe who possess time travel technology. The politics of the temporal powers play a major role in the Gallifrey audio series, which centres around Romana's presidency.
 Co-ordinator Vansell first appeared in The Sirens of Time and returns in Neverland and in the Doctor Who Unbound play, He Jests at Scars...

External links
Big Finish Productions – The Apocalypse Element

Sixth Doctor audio plays
Dalek audio plays
Plays by Stephen Cole
2000 audio plays
Gallifrey audio plays